The Canadian Pacific River Lake and River Service, also known as the British Columbia Lake and River Service,  was a division of Canadian Pacific Railway (CPR) which began operating passenger and cargo shipping routes along British Columbia's inland waters during the late 19th century.

CPR overview
In 1884, CPR began purchasing sailing ships as part of a railway supply service on the Great Lakes. Over time, CPR became a railroad company with widely organized water transportation auxiliaries including the Canadian Pacific Railway Upper Lake Service, the Trans-Pacific service, the British Columbia Coast Steamships, the British Columbia Lake and River Service, the Trans-Atlantic service, and the Ferry service.

In the 20th century, the company evolved into a transcontinental railroad which operated two transoceanic services which connected Canada with Europe and with Asia. The range of CPR services were aspects of an integrated plan.

British Columbia Lake and River Service
CPR's expansion in the West included expanding routes. More ships were added to the inland waters fleet.  For example, in 1901 CPR built three sternwheelers for use on the Yukon River — the Tyrrell, the Duschesnay, and the Dawson.  The investment in more ships was accompanied by increased numbers of CPR workers. Expansion required additional CPR station and terminal structures to be built.

Inland fleet

21st century
Despite many changes, including corporate mergers and restructuring, some elements of the lake service continue to operate.

See also

 CP Ships

Notes

References
 Morley, Alan. (1961). Vancouver; from Milltown to Metropolis. Vancouver: Mitchell.  OCLC 70456349
 Musk, George. (1981).  Canadian Pacific: The Story of the Famous Shipping Line.  Toronto: Holt, Rinehart and Winston of Canada. ;  OCLC 7540915

Canadian Pacific Railway